Crossroads is an unincorporated community in Armstrong Township, Vanderburgh County, in the U.S. state of Indiana.

History

A post office was established at Crossroads in 1850, but was soon discontinued, in 1851.

Geography

References

Unincorporated communities in Vanderburgh County, Indiana
Unincorporated communities in Indiana